Euphaedra vulnerata is a butterfly in the family Nymphalidae. It is found in Cameroon and Equatorial Guinea (Bioko).

References

Butterflies described in 1916
vulnerata
Butterflies of Africa